Johanna Lüttge (later Hübner then Langer; born 20 March 1936 – 14 November 2022) was a retired East German athlete. She competed in the shot put at the 1956, 1960 and 1964 Summer Olympics and finished in 11th, 2nd and 9th place, respectively.

She married twice, first to Mr. Hübner and later to Rudolf Langer, a German athlete who also competed in the shot put at the 1964 Olympics.

References

1936 births
2022 deaths
People from Sömmerda (district)
People from the Province of Saxony
German female shot putters
East German female shot putters
Sportspeople from Thuringia
Olympic athletes of the United Team of Germany
Athletes (track and field) at the 1956 Summer Olympics
Athletes (track and field) at the 1960 Summer Olympics
Athletes (track and field) at the 1964 Summer Olympics
Olympic silver medalists for the United Team of Germany
Medalists at the 1960 Summer Olympics
Olympic silver medalists in athletics (track and field)
Recipients of the Patriotic Order of Merit in bronze